Shadow Knight may refer to:
 Shadow Knight (comics), a Marvel Comics supervillain
 Shadow Knight, a supplemental rule book for the Amber Diceless Roleplaying Game
 Shadow Knights, a 1991 video game

See also
 Knight of Shadows (disambiguation)